This is a list of equipment of the New Zealand Army currently in use. It includes small arms, combat vehicles, aircraft, watercraft, artillery and transport vehicles. The New Zealand Army is the principal land warfare force of New Zealand, a part of the New Zealand Defence Force. Since the ANZUS breakup and the end of the Cold War, the New Zealand Army has been deployed to a number of conflict zones, often as part of a coalition force or part of a United Nations peacekeeping operation.

Infantry section equipment 
A standard New Zealand infantry section consists of ten soldiers, divided into two five-men infantry fireteams. While equipment formations can be tailored as required by section and platoon commanders, infantry sections are usually issued with the following:

Weapons 

 Eight LMT MARS-L rifles, two of which are usually equipped with an M203 under-barrel grenade launcher.
 One LMT 308 MWS designated marksman rifle.
 One FN Maximi light machine gun.
 Nine M7 bayonets for use with LMT MARS-L and LMT 308 MWS rifles.

Vision systems 

 Advanced Combat Optical Gunsight (ACOG) to be used with the LMT MARS-L rifle.
 Leupold & Stevens Mark 6 telescopic sight to be used with the LMT 308 MWS designated marksman rifle.
 Dueck Defense rapid transition sight to be used with the LMT 308 MWS designated marksman rifle.

Uniforms

Weapons

Pistols

Assault rifles

Precision rifles & sniper rifles

Machine guns

Shotguns

Grenade Launchers

Mortars

Anti-material weapons

Artillery

Electronic warfare

Vehicles

Watercraft

Aircraft

Future equipment
Equipment is trialed for the New Zealand army under the Battle Lab program.

 Electric Utility Motorcycles - UBCO electric bikes are currently being trialed by Battle Lab for the purposes of reconnaissance and surveillance, airfield security and other transport roles.
 Electric Staff Vehicles - In efforts to reduce its carbon footprint, the army is trialing the electric Hyundai Ioniq, in addition to installing electric vehicle charging stations at Trentham Military Camp.

See also
 List of individual weapons of the New Zealand armed forces
 Tanks of New Zealand
 Uniforms of the New Zealand Army
 List of former equipment of the New Zealand Army

References

New Zealand Army
Weapons of New Zealand
Military equipment of New Zealand
New Zealand Army
Equipment